Dale Thomas may refer to:

 Dale O. Thomas (1923–2004), American wrestler and wrestling coach
 Dale Thomas (footballer) (born 1987), Australian rules footballer

See also